Edgewood High School may refer to:

Edgewood High School (West Covina, California) in West Covina, California
Edgewood High School (Indiana) in Elettsville, Indiana 
Edgewood High School (Maryland) in Edgewood, Maryland 
Edgewood High School (Trenton, Ohio) 
Edgewood High School (Ashtabula, Ohio)
Edgewood High School (Edgewood, Texas)
Edgewood High School of the Sacred Heart in Madison, Wisconsin 
Edgewood-Colesburg High School in Edgewood, Iowa
Edgewood Fine Arts Academy in San Antonio, Texas (formerly known as Edgewood High School)
Edgewood Greater Boston Academy in Stoneham, Massachusetts
Edgewood Regional High School in Atco, New Jersey
Edgewood Junior/Senior High School (Merritt Island, Florida)
Edgewood High School (California) in West Covina, California West Covina High School